Sir Duncombe Colchester (1630–1694), of Westbury-on-Severn and the Wilderness, Abbinghall, Gloucestershire, was an English politician.

He was a Member (MP) of the Parliament of England for Bere Alston in 1681 and for Gloucester in 1689.

References

1630 births
1694 deaths
Members of the Parliament of England for Bere Alston
People from Gloucestershire
Members of the Parliament of England (pre-1707) for Gloucester
English MPs 1681
English MPs 1689–1690
People from Westbury-on-Severn